Freckled Max and the Spooks is a 1987 Czechoslovak/West German recut of the series Frankenstein's Aunt into a 96-minute film.

Story
The film is based on the Allan Rune Pettersson book Frankenstein's Aunt, but with several changes. Similar to the book, Aunt Hannah comes to  Victor Frankenstein, but rather with the aim of finding a bride for her nephew so that there can be "little Frankensteins" in the family. However, Frankenstein is too busy for this. He is trying to create a man with the power of a machine and the brain of a genius.

External links 
 

1987 films
Czechoslovak horror films
West German films
Films based on Swedish novels
Films directed by Juraj Jakubisko
Frankenstein films
Slovak horror films
Films edited from television programs
Czechoslovak comedy films
Slovak comedy films
German comedy horror films
1980s German films